Cycling World magazine was first published in 1979. A consumer focused monthly magazine for the cycling enthusiast promoting cycling as a leisure pursuit for all. In July 2015 David Robert became the editor of the magazine. It is published by Cpl Media.

References

External links
 

1976 establishments in the United Kingdom
Monthly magazines published in the United Kingdom
Sports magazines published in the United Kingdom
Cycling magazines published in the United Kingdom
Magazines established in 1976